The Devilles may refer to:

The Box Tops
The DeVilles (New York band)

See also
Deville (disambiguation)